Casey Redford (born 10 September 1982) is an Australian Paralympic swimmer. A Victorian Institute of Sport scholarship holder, she won three gold medals at the 1999 FESPIC Games, and a bronze medal at the 2000 Summer Paralympics in Sydney in the Women's 100 m backstroke S9 event.

Personal
Redford was born in Melbourne on 10 September 1982, and was educated at Mentone Girls' Secondary College.

Competitive swimming
Redford was a Victorian Institute of Sport scholarship holder. She competed in the 1998 Australian Swimming Open, representing the Haileybury Waterlion Swimming Club. She competed in the Open 100 m Breaststroke, where she made the finals. She also competed in the Open 100 m Breaststroke, Open 100 m Freestyle, Open 50 m Backstroke and Open 50 m Butterfly, but did not get past the heats. However, she did set a club records for 15-year-olds in the 50 m freestyle (LC) category with a time of 35.08 seconds, in the butterfly event with a personal best with a time of 40.06 seconds, and in the 100 m freestyle event with a time of 1:19.19.

Redford competed at the 1999 FESPIC Games in Thailand, where she won a gold medal in the women's 100m freestyle event, a gold medal in the women's 100m backstroke event, and a gold medal in the women's 200 m individual medley event. On 3 June 2000, Redford set an age group record for 17-year-olds in the 100 m breaststroke event in the SB9 class  at a meet in Sheffield, Victoria with a time of 1:35.53. She went on to win a bronze medal at the 2000 Summer Paralympics in Sydney in the women's 100 m backstroke S9 event, with a time of 1:20.02. She also competed in the 200 m individual medley S9 and 100 m breaststroke S9 events, but did not qualify for the finals. In 2001, she competed in the Victorian Swim Championships, coming first in the Multidisability Women's 50 m backstroke event.

Recognition
In 2000, Redford was named on the Victorian School Sports Awards Honour Roll.

References

1982 births
Female Paralympic swimmers of Australia
Swimmers at the 2000 Summer Paralympics
Paralympic bronze medalists for Australia
Living people
Victorian Institute of Sport alumni
Medalists at the 2000 Summer Paralympics
Paralympic medalists in swimming
FESPIC Games competitors
Swimmers from Melbourne
Australian female medley swimmers
Australian female backstroke swimmers
Australian female breaststroke swimmers
S9-classified Paralympic swimmers